Tank: The Progress of a Monstrous War Machine is a comprehensive history of the tank and its uses throughout the 20th century by historian Patrick Wright.

References

Peter Wollen, 'Tankishness'.

Books about military history
2002 non-fiction books